Frank Derek Kidner (22 September 1913 – 27 November 2008) was a British Old Testament scholar, best known for writing commentaries.

Life 
Kidner studied piano at the Royal College of Music, before preparing for Anglican ministry at Ridley Hall, Cambridge and Christ's College, Cambridge. While at Cambridge, he continued his interest in music through performances with the Cambridge University Musical Society.

His first role in the Church of England was as Curate of St Nicholas Church, Sevenoaks. He then served as the vicar of Holy Cross Church, Felsted. Kidner then taught at Oak Hill Theological College for thirteen years, before becoming Warden of Tyndale House in 1964. In the same year, he published his first Bible commentary, on the Book of Proverbs, in the Tyndale Old Testament Commentaries series. He was chairman of the editorial committee which compiled Christian Praise, a hymn book "for use by Churches, Schools [and] Youth Fellowships" published by The Tyndale Press in 1957. 

Kidner retired from his post at Tyndale House in 1978 and moved to Histon where he spent the last 30 years of his life. He continued writing commentaries, concluding with The Message of Jeremiah in 1987.

Works 
Kidner wrote commentaries on the books of Genesis, Ezra–Nehemiah, Psalms, Proverbs, Ecclesiastes, Jeremiah, and Hosea, the most popular of which were published in the Tyndale Old Testament Commentaries and The Bible Speaks Today series. When Inter-Varsity Press replaced some of the volumes in these series due to their age, Kidner's original commentaries were republished as part of a new Kidner Classic Commentaries series.

Bibliography

References

1913 births
2008 deaths
20th-century English Anglican priests
Alumni of the Royal College of Music
Alumni of Christ's College, Cambridge
British biblical scholars
Old Testament scholars
Bible commentators
Evangelical Anglican biblical scholars
Evangelical Anglican clergy
Anglican clergy from London
People from Histon and Impington